Quail Island is the name of various locations:

Quail Island (New Zealand), in Canterbury
An islet in Palmyra Atoll, US Minor Outlying Islands
Quail Island (Victoria), Australia
Quail Island (Northern Territory), Australia
Quail Island, Cape Verde, near Praia, the capital of Cape Verde